Magdalena Medio Antioquia is a subregion in the Colombian Department of Antioquia. The region is made up by 6 municipalities. The region is determined by its location within the Middle Magdalena Region which covers the central area of the Magdalena River basin.

Municipios Que Lo Conforman

Regions of Antioquia Department